Prăjeni is a commune in Botoșani County, Western Moldavia, Romania. It is composed of four villages: Câmpeni, Lupăria, Miletin and Prăjeni.

References

Communes in Botoșani County
Localities in Western Moldavia